KolymaReservoir is an artificial lake which was created by the construction of the Kolyma Hydroelectric Station on the Kolyma. It was designed by Lenhydroproject. Filling began in 1980 and it was commissioned in 1995.

Description
The Kolyma Reservoir is in the Upper Kolyma Highlands. The town of Sinegorye, Yagodninsky District, is located downstream from the dam.
Besides the Kolyma, rivers Tenka and Kongo flow into the reservoir.

After filling the reservoir  of farmland were flooded, as well as several workers' settlements, including Sibik-Tyllah, Vetreny, Yasnaya Polyana, Tyoply, Yubileiny and Kongo.

An Old Stone Age archaeological site located by the mouth of the Kongo was also flooded by the waters of the Kolyma reservoir. It belonged to the Paleolithic Siberdikov culture of the upper Kolyma river. On it were found stone cutters, knives, arrowheads and pick-shaped tools belonging to a human group engaged in hunting wild horses and reindeer.

See also 
 Kolyma Hydroelectric Station
 Ust-Srednekan Hydroelectric Plant

References

External links

Reservoirs built in the Soviet Union
Reservoirs in Russia
Reservoirs in Magadan Oblast
Kolyma basin